This is a list of National Soccer League players who made 300 or more appearances in the National Soccer League, the top level of the Australian soccer league system from 1977 to 2004.

From the National Soccer League's formation at the start of the 1977 season to its disbandment at the end of the 2003–04 season, one player accrued 500 or more appearances in the National Soccer League. The  player to reach the milestone was defender Alex Tobin, in representation of Adelaide City, Parramatta Power and Northern Spirit; his 500th match was for Northern Spirit in February 2003. 

The only player from outside the Australia to play 500 National Soccer League games is New Zealand forward Vaughan Coveny.

List of players
Players are initially listed by number of appearances. If number of appearances are equal, the players are then listed chronologically by the year of first appearance. If still tied, the players are listed alphabetically.

References 

Association football player non-biographical articles
Lists of soccer players by club in Australia